Roberto Daniel Garcés Salazar (born 7 June 1993) is an Ecuadorian footballer who plays for C.S. Emelec.

Club career
He began his career with Aucas in 2013.

Career statistics

References

1993 births
Living people
Footballers from Quito
Association football midfielders
Ecuadorian footballers
Ecuadorian Serie A players
S.D. Aucas footballers
C.D. El Nacional footballers
L.D.U. Quito footballers
C.S.D. Independiente del Valle footballers
C.S.D. Macará footballers